Príbeh is the fourth album by the Slovak punk rock band Iné Kafe, released on September 21, 2001.

Track listing

Personnel
 Vratko Rohoň - vocals, guitar
 Tibor Prikler - guitar (1, 6, 10, 14)
 Peter "Forus" Fóra - bass, guitar (16), backing vocals
 Dano Mathia – drums, percussions

Guest artists
 Roman "Fernet" Slávik - backing vocals
 Maťo Máček - backing vocals (7, 12, 15)
 girls from Šulekovo (10)
 Sanchez

References

2001 albums
Iné Kafe albums